Staroye Stenino is a rural locality (a village) in Petushinskoye Rural Settlement, Petushinsky District, Vladimir Oblast, Russia. The population was 7 as of 2010.

Geography 
Staroye Stenino is located 23 km north of Petushki (the district's administrative centre) by road. Vospushka is the nearest rural locality.

References 

Rural localities in Petushinsky District